Aleksandar Bogdanović  (Serbian Cyrillic: Александар Богдановић; born 2 August 1973) is a Serbian retired footballer who played for several clubs in Europe, including FK Železnik and FK Javor Ivanjica in the Serbian SuperLiga and Erzurumspor in Turkey.

External links
 Profile at Srbijafudbal
 Profile at TFF.org

1973 births
Living people
People from Priboj
Serbian footballers
Serbian expatriate footballers
Association football defenders
Erzurumspor footballers
Expatriate footballers in Turkey
FK Mladost Apatin players
FK Železnik players
FK Javor Ivanjica players
Serbian SuperLiga players
Süper Lig players